Søren Carl Theodor Marius Sørensen (24 July 1893 in Altona, Hamburg, Germany – 12 September 1979 in Copenhagen, Denmark) was a Danish landscape architect who is considered to be one of the greatest landscape architects of the 20th century. A contemporary of Thomas Church, Geoffrey Jellicoe and Luis Barragán he was a leading figure in the first generation of Modernists in landscape design. He is best known for designing the first Adventure playground (in partnership with Hans Dragehjelm) in Emdrup, Copenhagen.

Career
Sørensen was a prolific author producing eight books, editing two volumes and writing hundreds of articles. Only one short book has been translated into English and another into German and Dutch. His books covers open space in urban life, horticulture, the history of garden art, principles of garden design, education and autobiography.

Sørensen worked with Copenhagen schoolteacher Hans Dragehjelm (1875-1948) on the first ever adventure playground in Emdrup, a district of the Danish capital Copenhagen in 1940. Photos from the time show children playing with bricks, digging in the mud and building dens with wood and nails. In his book  (Park Politics in the parish and market town), Sørensen stated his belief that "children's playgrounds are the city's most important form of public plantation". He believed children needed sun and open space to play in and hated the trend for dark, shady courtyards as play spaces. He called them  ("junk playgrounds").

His designs reflected the Modernist movement and include strong geometric shapes and graceful landforms.

He started teaching at the Royal Danish Academy of Fine Arts in Copenhagen in 1940 and was professor of landscape architecture there from 1954 to 1963.
He was awarded the Eckersberg Medal in 1945 and the Prince Eugen Medal in 1972.

Major Projects 

 Eidsvold Værk (garden), Norway
 The Kampmann Garden
 Vitus Berings Park I, Horsens
 Vitus Berings Park II, Horsens
 De Geometriske Haver, Herning (1983)
 Klokkergården
 Høstrup Park
 The Church Plaza, Kalundborg
 Bellahøj Open-air Theatre, Copenhagen
 Aarhus University Park
 The Mølleå Canal, Åbenrå
 Kogenhus Memorial Park, Viborg
 The Golden Chain Garden in Middelfart
 The Sonja Poll Garden (designed for his daughter in 1970), Holte
 The Oval Gardens (allotment gardens), Nærum

Bibliography 
 "Om Indretning af Haver", 1930, 1941 (with P. Wad)
 "Parkpolitik i Sogn og Købstad", 1931 (reprint), Copenhagen 1978, 
 "Om Haver", 1939.
 "Buske og Træer", 1948 (edited with Valdemar Jensen and H.K. Paludanred)
 "Frilandsblomster", 1949 (edited with Valdemar Jensen and H.K. Paludanred)
 "Europas Havekunst fra Alhambra til Liselund", 1959, 1979.
 "The Origin of Garden Art", 1963 (reissued in: "Havekunst, Sophienholm", 1977) 
 "39 Haveplaner. Typiske haver til et typehus", 1966.
 "Haver. Tanker og arbejder", 1975.

References

Literature
 Andersson, Sven-Ingvar – Hoyer, Steen (2001): "C.Th. Sørensen – Landscape Modernist". The Danish Architectural Press.

External links 

 Natural Play in natural Surroundings Urban Childhood and Playground Planning in Denmark, c. 1930–1950 (Ning de Coninck-Smith)
 First chapter of Landscape Modernist
 AdventurePlay.org.uk

1893 births
1979 deaths
Danish landscape architects
People from Altona, Hamburg
Recipients of the Eckersberg Medal
Architects from Hamburg
Playgrounds
Burials at Mariebjerg Cemetery